Fishy may refer to:

 Fishy, a film written and directed by Maria Blom
 Fishy, a 2006 short film by Steve Koren
 Aunt Fishy, a character in the 2015 American film Love the Coopers
 Fishy, a character in the 2010 novel Boxer, Beetle by British author Ned Beauman
 "Fishy", a 2000 single by Lithuanian pop band SKAMP

See also
 "Fishies", a track from the 2007 album So Many Nights by The Cat Empire
Fish